Cukor Bila Smerť (Ukrainian: Цукор — біла смерть, ; lit. Sugar — White Death) was a Ukrainian rock band formed in Kyiv, Ukraine. The band was active from 1988, until it's dissolution in 1993. It one of the first bands that initiated the creation of ethno-gothic scene in Ukraine. Considered to be one of the most prominent music bands of Ukrainian underground.

History 
The main figure of this project was Svitlana Nianio. After graduating from music school with a degree in piano, she began composing music. At first she played with cellist Tamila Mazur. Sugar - White Death was formed when they were joined by guitarist Jevhen Taran and pianist Oleksandr Kochanovskyj. The band significantly differed from the music of that time by high female vocals, non-sensical lyrics, and, previously unknown, instrumental-gothic performance.

In 1988 they released their debut album, "Rododendrony Karalovi Aspydy". A year after, in 1989, two more albums were released: a compilation "Novye Nezhenki" and a studio album "Lilei I Amarillisy".

In 1991, in collaboration with Ukrainian musician Ivan Samshyt, was released more industrial sounding album called "Samshit Ne Sahar".

At that time, alternative bands were not able to make professional recordings in Ukraine and like other well-known Ukrainian bands, they recorded on the Polish label Koka Records. Two albums are available on this label: "Manirna Muzyka" (1991) and "Selo" (1993).

According to another prominent Ukrainian underground musician, Ihor Cymbrovskyj, who also recorded for Koka Records, the band has fans in Poland, where there are more listeners of such music than in Ukraine. In particular, Polish experimental band Księżyc have repeatedly stated that they were inspired by the works of Svitlana Nianio.

The collective disbanded in 1993, after which, former members continued to release solo records.

Discography

Studio Albums 

 Rododendrony Karalovi Aspydy (1988)
 Lilei I Amarillisy (1989)
 Manirna Muzyka (1991)
 Selo (1993)

Collaborations 

 Samshit Ne Sahar (with Ivan Samshyt; 1991)

Compilations 

 Novye Nezhenki (1989)

Sources 

 Цукор тільки на експорт // «Moloda Hvardija» (Kyiv). — 15 May 1991. (№ 134).
 Oleksander Jevtushenko. Колізей чекає! //  «Moloda Hvardija» (Kyiv). — 3 October 1990. (№117).

References 

Musical groups from Kyiv
Musical groups established in 1989
Musical groups disestablished in 1993
Ukrainian musical groups